The survival horror video games series Silent Hill features a large cast of characters. The games' player characters are "everymen", in contrast to action-oriented survival horror video game series featuring combat-trained player characters, such as Resident Evil. The games are set in the series' eponymous fictional American town.

Characters went through several conceptual different phases prior to their final designs. The physical appearances of Silent Hill 3 characters were created using actors as models.

Design
Silent Hill and Silent Hill 2 characters were designed by Takayoshi Sato. Team Silent, a production group within Konami Computer Entertainment Tokyo, oversaw the process. Team Silent designed the character Maria to have physical flaws and did not base her on any particular model. The developers toned down her design because of technical problems with her low neckline. To better capture her facial movements, Sato Takayoshi practiced expressions in front of a mirror and drew her facial expressions instead of using motion capture. Maria and Mary share the same facial structure, polygon count and voice actor; only the muscle structure differs. Takayoshi designed Angela to appear older than her intended age of sixteen or seventeen and the developers chose an older voice actor for her.  Fifty to sixty Japanese and American voice actors auditioned for Silent Hill 2, with five ultimately chosen: Guy Cihi, Donna Burke, David Schaufele, Jakey Breckenridge, and Monica Horgan. Motion capture of the voice actors was used to model their action.

The Silent Hill 3 development team initially saw Heather as "innocent", something that was reflected in original sketches of her, but they found this motif to be too "nice", so the game's supervising illustrator Shingo Yuri modeled Heather after French actresses Sophie Marceau and Charlotte Gainsbourg, with Vanessa Paradis serving as a model for concept art. The character's leg-revealing outfit and slightly curly hair was the subject of debate among Yuri and two female members of the development team: while Yuri firstly envisioned her wearing jeans, these members convinced him that she needed more sex appeal. Yuri also accepted their view that curly hair would be more suitable for a young girl. The character's name was taken from Heather Morris, who provided Heather's voice and motion capture.

Priestess Claudia Wolf was the biggest design challenge. She was intended to look strange, but conventional and evoke a sense of danger. To reflect her evil nature, the development team imagined her with a shaved head and tattoos. Other dropped ideas included portraying her as a "holy woman" as well as dressing her in a long robe. The team opted to remove her eyebrows to making her expression unreadable. Hollywood actress Julianne Moore was used as a model. Claudia's name originates from Italian actress Claudia Cardinale. Claudia replaced the original Christie, because the latter was viewed as too cute.

Silent Hill 3s male characters were delineated by the development team as possessing flaws and complexes to add realism. Douglas Cartland was given a combover. Early on, he was seen as a middle-aged detective. A priest from The Fifth Element was the basis for this generation of Douglas; actors such as Ian Holm and Giancarlo Giannini were models for some of the character's concept art. Douglas' name was taken from actor Douglas Fairbanks, Jr., because it "just seemed to suit him". 

Vincent's design centered on making him a hypocrite clad in "nice" clothes and of a neat appearance. Incorporation of hints aiming at revealing Vincent's nature were added,by giving him a laugh "like he is hiding something nasty" and during his speech, "one of his eyes is not looking at the observer.".

Main game series characters
Note: Some characters may or may not appear in Silent Hill 2 or Silent Hill 3, depending on their fate in the previous games.

Silent Hill

Harry Mason
 is the player character. A widower, writer and father of his adopted daughter Cheryl. They crash while driving past Silent Hill. He either dies or escapes the town by himself or with police officer Cybil.

Harry makes a cameo in Silent Hill 3, which stars Heather, Harry's adopted daughter and Alessa's reincarnation. He quickly dies when the Order removes his heart.

Harry is the protagonist of the Silent Hill: Shattered Memories reimagining, which starts similarly to the original game. However, it is revealed that Harry had died long before, and his "travel" through Silent Hill is actually inside his daughter Cheryl's head, who broke down after Harry died in a car crash. Multiple endings reveal that Harry as potentially an alcoholic, coward, or womanizer.

In the games, Harry is voiced by Michael Guinn (credited as Michael G.) in the original game and by Kirk Thornton in Shattered Memories.

In the films, Harry's role is divided among Rose and Christopher Da Silva. In the Silent Hill film, Harry's role is played by Rose. In Silent Hill: Revelation the plot is retconned, although Rose is still in Silent Hill. Christopher then takes the role of Harry, adopting the alias Harry Mason. Christopher enters Silent Hill to search for Rose. He is portrayed by Sean Bean.

Cheryl Mason

 is the adopted daughter of Harry Mason. She is actually the untainted half of Alessa Gillespie's soul, which split during Alessa's ritualistic immolation by the Order. The soul was reincarnated into baby Cheryl. Seven years afterward, Cheryl and Harry crash their car to avoid hitting Alessa. Cheryl is seen running down an alley, but is never seen again. She fuses with Alessa, becoming an angelic being called the Incubator. If Harry faces the Incubator's evil side, the Incubus, Cheryl's spirit thanks Harry for his hospitality before reincarnating along with Alessa as a baby girl, whom Harry adopts and names Heather. 

In Silent Hill: Shattered Memories, Cheryl, Heather, and Alessa are all reimagined as "Cheryl Heather Mason", the biological daughter of Harry and Dahlia Mason. She refuses to accept her father's death, imagining him stranded in Silent Hill. She hates her mother, blaming her for divorcing Harry, though they reconcile at the end. In the Silent Hill film, Cheryl, renamed Sharon da Silva, is adopted by the da Silvas. She is abducted by the Order, but is rescued by her mother and her own dark self, the latter massacring the entire Order. Sharon then merges with her original and dark selves. The sequel, Silent Hill: Revelation retcons this as Sharon, now known as Heather, searches for her father.

Jodie Mason
 is the late wife of Harry and the adopting mother of Cheryl. She was Harry's high school sweetheart, and their marriage is described as a "nine-year honeymoon". Jodie contracts an illness that leaves her unable to have children, and dies when Cheryl is three. Jodie's persona is combined with that of Dahlia to become Dahlia Mason, the ex-wife of Harry and mother of Cheryl in Silent Hill: Shattered Memories.

Dahlia Gillespie
 is the leader of the Order. She is the main antagonist of Silent Hill and Silent Hill: Origins. Dahlia is the mother of Alessa, whom she abused. She wants to birth the God. She explained the Order to the children of the orphanage. In Silent Hill: Origins, as part of the birthing ritual, Dahlia immolates Alessa. Dahlia fails to birth the God. In Silent Hill, Dahlia first appears as a bystander, but later reveals that she has ordered Cheryl's abduction. She fuses Cheryl with Alessa. The Incubator's evils are then expelled by Kaufmann as the Incubus, who incinerates Dahlia. In Silent Hill 4: The Room, it is revealed that Dahlia took part in brainwashing Walter Sullivan, leading him to believe that the 21 Sacraments are the only way to see his "mother".

Dahlia and Jodie merge to become Dahlia Mason in Silent Hill: Shattered Memories. She divorced Harry years earlier, earning her daughter's hatred. Dahlia reconciles with Cheryl after the latter accepts Harry's demise. Dahlia appears in the Silent Hill film, where she is a much more sympathetic character who is tricked to hand Alessa over to her sister, Christabella. Dahlia survives the Alyssa's killing of the Order, as a loving mother. In Silent Hill: Revelation, Dahlia appears in a minor role giving cryptic warnings to Heather.

Dahlia is voiced by Liz Mamorsky in the original game, Laurence Bouvard in Origins, and by Laura Bailey in Shattered Memories.

Alessa Gillespie
 is the central character of Silent Hill, Silent Hill 3, and Silent Hill: Origins, the series' most important character. Dahlia's daughter, she was born with powers, which allowed Dahlia to use her to birth the God of the Order. In her childhood, she was best friends with Claudia, the only person who ever understood her. Alessa was immolated by Dahlia and rescued by Travis. Through the Flauros, Alessa's soul split, one half of which went into Cheryl. Alessa is kept alive, suffering with incurable wounds and projecting her nightmares onto the town. In Silent Hill, a projection of Alessa makes Harry crash his car, allowing Cheryl to recombine with her. The Incubator then merges Cheryl and Alessa into baby Heather. Alessa also appears in Silent Hill 4: The Room on a medallion titled as Saint Alessa.

In the Silent Hill film, Alessa is then split into three: her pure self, who is reincarnated into a baby that the da Silvas adopted as Sharon; her dark self; and her original body. Alessa's dark self merges into Rose so she can then exterminate Christabella's cult. Afterwards, the three selves recombine in Sharon's body. The sequel retcons this as Alessa's dark self roams free, who manages to later combine with Heather.

Alessa is voiced by Sandra Wane in the original game and Jennifer Woodward in Origins.

Cybil Bennett
 is a cop from the neighboring town of Brahms, whom Harry meets before crashing in Silent Hill. She is possessed by a parasite, which affects game endings; if Cybil is rescued, she escapes alongside Harry. Her fate is uncertain; her only other mention in the canonical games is in Silent Hill: Homecoming, when James mentions her. In Silent Hill: Shattered Memories, Cybil is reimagined, reappearing as the cop whom Harry encounters. In the Silent Hill film, Cybil helps Rose search for Sharon, but gets captured by the Order, who burns her alive.

Cybil is voiced by Susan Papa in the original game and by Kirsten Potter in Shattered Memories. In the film, she is portrayed by Laurie Holden.

Dr. Michael Kaufmann
 is the director of Alchemilla Hospital. He is part of the Order and aids Dahlia's plans to birth the God. After Alessa's immolation, Kaufmann commits Alessa to the hospital and forces his girlfriend Lisa, to keep Alessa alive. In Silent Hill, Kaufmann defies Dahlia by throwing the Aglaophotis to the Incubator, expelling the Incubus. Kaufmann attempts to follow Harry through the portal, but he is stopped by Lisa's spirit. Kaufmann reappears in Silent Hill: Shattered Memories as a psychiatrist who periodically performs psychological questionnaires and tests on the player.

Michael is voiced by Jarion Monroe in the original game, John Chancer in Origins, and by Michael McConnohie in Shattered Memories.

Lisa Garland
 is a nurse working at Alchemilla Hospital. In Silent Hill: Origins, Lisa is addicted to a drug called PTV. She accepts drugs in exchange for caring for Alessa. Lisa is fazed by how Alessa's persistent wounds and she becomes involved with the Order. Lisa dies between Silent Hill: Origins and Silent Hill, possibly due to overdose, but returns in Silent Hill. Lisa helps Harry around Silent Hill and tells him about the Order. She realizes that she is just a manifestation and disappears. In the ending Lisa's spirit stops Kaufmann and drags him to his death. Lisa has a brief appearance in Silent Hill: Shattered Memories, where Harry saves her only for her to succumb to her injuries: in one ending, it is implied that she is his mistress. Lisa also appears in the Silent Hill film, though she is unnamed and credited as "Red Nurse". She peeks at Alyssa who reacts violently and burns her eyes.

Lisa is voiced by Thessaly Lerner in the original game and Jennifer Woodward in Origins.

K. Gordon/Mr. Gordon
 K. Gordon was a teacher in Silent Hill. His only presence is in memos and items belonging to him, which gradually allude to his profession and relationship with Alessa. His name appears when Harry Mason discovers a key labeled "K. Gordon". This key opens the K. Gordon House. He is also on a list of teachers.
 In Silent Hill 3 his name appears in the church when Heather comes across a classroom that is identical to Alessa's. She finds K. Gordon's notebook. The transcript reveals that Alessa was one of his students, and that he harbored concerns about her.
 He appears in Silent Hill: Shattered Memories having an affair with Cheryl. He is the teacher in the "paparazzi photos". His phone number can be found on a classroom desk. If Harry Mason calls it, he learns that Mr. Gordon has been receiving harassing phone calls from students. The message varies depending on the player's Psych Profile.

God
The  is the Order's deity and the foremost antagonist. It served as the final boss of Origins, 1 and 3 and has cameos in 4, Shattered Memories, and Downpour. According to the Order's mythology, the God was birthed in ancient times by humans who sought an end to the constant suffering around them. The God took away mankind's immortality so they could appreciate death, and created linear time. It vowed to create a Paradise on Earth, but died. The God promised to return and complete its plan if its followers remained loyal.  The God takes four forms: the default form is a woman in a red dress, while as The Incubus it resembles the deity Baphomet. The Incubator is the version as seen by Alessa, The Demon in Silent Hill: Origins, and as Claudia Wolf version in Silent Hill 3. Silent Hill: Downpour implies that the God's original name was the Native American deity Kwekwaxawe (Raven) as Silent Hill was originally title The Nest of the Raven. The Order hopes to use Heather to birth the God, but she resists. Claudia attempts the ritual, but dies in the process. As a result of the botched birth process, the God is born prematurely, and is easily killed by Heather.

Silent Hill 2

James Sunderland
 is the primary player character of Silent Hill 2. His connection to Silent Hill is a letter from his wife Mary that arrives just after her death. The letter gradually fades, suggesting that James only imagined it. He encounters a videotape that shows him killing Mary. He concludes that he wants to be punished for the murder. 

Subsequent installments in the series made references to James. James makes cameo appearances in the joke endings of Silent Hill 3, Silent Hill: Shattered Memories (voiced by Tomm Hulett) and Silent Hill: Downpour.

James was portrayed by Guy Cihi in the original version and by Troy Baker in the game's 2011 remastering.

Maria

 is a sexualized manifestation of Mary based on an exotic dancer. She exists only in James' mind. She first appears in "Born from a Wish", a sub-scenario prior to the events in the main game that appeared in the expanded versions of Silent Hill 2. Thereafter she accompanies James throughout the game, repeatedly getting and reappearing. 

Maria is portrayed by Monica Taylor Horgan.

Angela Orosco
 is a disturbed, suicidal teenage girl who is ostensibly on a search for her mother. The game strongly implied that Angela was abused and raped by her father, with her mother turning a blind eye. Backstory material provided by Konami states that Angela had run away from home prior to the game's events. She kills her father, which draws her to Silent Hill.

She is last seen on a burning staircase in the Lakeview Hotel. She walks into the flames and is not seen again. 
 
Angela is voiced in the game by Donna Burke. The designers intended to make her appear unnaturally aged.

Mary Shepherd-Sunderland
 is the late wife of James Sunderland. The player first sees Mary in a photograph with James. She is presented to have died from a mysterious illness. The couple shared many memories in Silent Hill. She appears in person only at the end of the game.

Mary made a cameo in Silent Hill: Shattered Memories in her monster form and in a joke ending of Downpour and Book of Memories.

Mary (and Maria) was portrayed by Monica Taylor Horgan. The producers acknowledged that the two were designed to be almost completely identical.

Eddie Dombrowski
 is the third murderous character in Silent Hill. He is an obese young man with an apparent connection to Laura. His suffered verbal abuse for much of his life. Before his arrival he killed a dog, shot a football player and ran from the police. Backstory material provided by Konami describes Eddie as being usually calm but with "another side that he cannot control when angered" and working at a gas station. Eddie wears a baseball cap, short shorts, and a white and teal striped shirt.

His final appearances are in the prison/labyrinth, where he confesses to 2 murders. His final appearance takes place in a meat locker.

Laura
 is an eight-year-old girl wandering the town. She is apparently the only "innocent" human character. Laura can apparently safely move around the town, while occasionally placing James in danger. Laura is an orphan who befriended Mary during her last year alive, while a patient at the same hospital.

Pyramid Head

Pyramid Head is the main antagonist of Silent Hill 2. It represents James' wish to be punished for Mary's death. Masahiro Ito, the designer of Silent Hill 2s monsters, created Pyramid Head because he wanted "a monster with a hidden face". Known for a large triangular head, Pyramid Head lacks a voice. Its appearance stems from the "distorted memory of the executioners" and the town's past as a place of execution, according to Takayoshi Sato, the character designer for Silent Hill 2. It was positively received in Silent Hill 2 for its role as an element of James' psyche.

After Silent Hill 2 Pyramid Head appeared in other Silent Hill games and media and became an icon in horror video games. Pyramid Head appeared in Homecoming as the "Bogeyman", in a cameo in Origins in a painting and a joke ending in Downpour and in the Silent Hill film as "Red Pyramid" and Revelation. He appeared in The Arcade, The Escape and Book of Memories. He appeared as a player character in the Nintendo DS video game New International Track & Field and Konami Krazy Racers.

Ernest Baldwin
 is a character from the Born from a Wish scenario of Silent Hill 2.

Silent Hill 3

Heather Mason

Claudia Wolf

 is a priestess of the cult and Silent Hill 3's primary antagonist. She was abused as a child. She was a childhood friend of Alessa. Claudia attempts to carry on for Dahlia and use Heather to birth "the god". Her intention in resurrecting the god is to "save" mankind, though she believes she is a sinner and will not be saved. She speaks in riddles and is always barefoot.

In the film series she is portrayed by Carrie-Anne Moss. She was voiced in the game by Donna Burke and Laura Bailey.

Leonard Wolf
 is Claudia's abusive father and a former member of the Order. He was condemned to a mental hospital for his insane and abusive behavior and stripped of his rank. However, he remained dedicated to the Order, which eventually led to his death. 

Leonard Wolf also appears in the 2012 film Silent Hill: Revelation. He is portrayed by Malcolm McDowell.

He is voiced by Matt Lagan in the original version, but the actor who portrayed Leonard in the HD Collection is unknown.

Douglas Cartland 
 is a private investigator hired by Claudia to locate Heather. 

Douglas is mentioned in one of the Order's books in Silent Hill Homecoming, which states that Douglas successfully exposed the cult to the authorities after the events of Silent Hill 3.

He is portrayed by Martin Donovan in the film series. He is voiced by Richard Grosse and Kirk Thornton in the HD collection.

Vincent Smith
 is a cult priest. Vincent is less dogmatic than Claudia and opposes her actions. Vincent appears to be on Heather's side during the game. He built the church where the final battle is staged in and is killed by Claudia when Heather enters.

He is portrayed by actor Kit Harington in the film series. He is voiced by Clifford Rippel and Yuri Lowenthal in the HD Collection.

Valtiel
 is an angel in the cult's religion. He is saintly being who attends to and watches over the religion's chief deity, and safeguards the mother until she gives birth to the deity. He resurrects the mother if she dies. He is a guide to the Otherworld, as he appears before Heather whenever the environment changes.

Valtiel also makes an appearance in Book of Memories and a cameo in the Silent Hill: Revelation movie.

Silent Hill 4: The Room

Henry Townshend
 (voiced by Eric Bossick) is the player character of Silent Hill 4: The Room. Reclusive and shy, he prefers not to show his emotions. He resides in Room 302 of South Ashfield Heights, but barely knows his neighbors, including Eileen and Frank., Henry keeps a photo album and scrapbook containing photos and articles, including photos he took in Silent Hill. Henry's endings are to be killed by Walter, to grieving over Eileen's death, or to greet Eileen later in with a bouquet of flowers. Henry is the final entry on Walter's kill list.

Eileen Galvin
 is Henry's next-door neighbor, although she barely knows him. Eileen accompanies Henry on throughout Walter's Otherworlds. Ellen is the penultimate entry on Walter's kill list.

Walter Sullivan
 is the main antagonist. He is abandoned by his parents at birth. He is taken in by Frank, who kept his umbilical cord while sending him to the hospital and then the orphanage. Dahlia abused him and taught him the Order's teachings. Walter became convinced that the room where he was born was his mother. George lets Valtiel inside Walter's subconscious, which leads him to reate his kill list. He continues killing as a ghost after his own death.

Cynthia Velasquez
 is a flirtatious Spanish-American whom Henry meets in the subway station. She believes that she is in a dream. After Walter kills her, Cynthia reappears as a vengeful ghost.

Cynthia is voiced by Lisa Ortiz.

Joseph Schreiber
 is a journalist who investigates the Order. The player controls Joseph at the beginning of the game before he gets killed by the ghost of Jimmy Stone. Joseph too returns as a ghost.

Frank Sunderland
 is the superintendent of South Ashfield Heights. He is the father of James. Frank once gave Henry a photo of the Toluca Lake, and is later revealed to have taken in Walter Sullivan when he was abandoned by his parents. He gave up Walter for adoption, but kept Walter's umbilical cord. Frank survives the game in most endings.

Jasper Gein
 is mentally unbalanced and is fascinated with the Order. He is friends with Bobby and Sein and is on Walter's kill list. Jasper later reappears as a burned ghost who haunts the orphanage.

Andrew DeSalvo
 is a middle-aged guardian of the orphanage employed by the Order. He enjoyed torturing the orphans. He is on Walter's kill list. His ghost resurfaces when Henry and Eileen visit the prison for the second time.

Richard Braintree
 is a violent sadist. He is on Walter's kill list. His ghost later haunts the Otherworld version of Room 207.

Silent Hill: Origins

Travis Grady
 is the player character. He is a truck driver with a traumatic childhood, an orphan whose mother went insane and tried to kill herself and Travis. His father committed suicide.  

In the film Silent Hill: Revelation, Travis appears in a cameo at the end of the film, when he agrees to take Sharon and Vincent from Silent Hill to "as far away as he can". He is portrayed by Peter Outerbridge.

Helen Grady
Helen Grady is the mother of Travis. Helen lost her mind and was committed to the Cedar Grove Sanatorium. Helen turned violent when she learned that Travis had come with his father to visit her. Her remains are discovered by Travis in the sanatorium.

Richard Grady
Richard is Travis' father and Helen's husband. Richard sent Helen to a sanatorium. Richard committed suicide fifteen years before the events of Silent Hill: Origins.

The Butcher
 is a monster similar to Pyramid Head and a manifestation of Travis's guilt who later appears in Book of Memories as a boss. The Bad ending implies that it is actually a split personality of Travis.

Silent Hill: Homecoming

Alex Shepherd
 is the protagonist. Alex is the eldest son of Adam and Lillian. He is a part of one of Shepherd's Glen's founding families. He had a close relationship with his younger brother, Joshua, whom his parents favored over him.

Joshua Shepherd
 is Alex's younger brother. The parents always favored Joshua and ignored Alex.

Elle Holloway
 is Alex's childhood friend and a part of the Holloway family. The eldest daughter of town judge, Margaret, Elle, like Alex, faces pressure to live up to her family name. She rejects theOrder.

James Wheeler
 is a deputy police officer. He worked with Adam and knew Alex.

Margaret Holloway
 is one of the main antagonists. She is a judge and a member of the Holloway family. Her daughters are Elle and Nora. Margaret is a sadist.

Curtis Ackers
 is one of the main antagonists. He is a repairman and a member of the Order.

Adam and Lillian Shepherd
They favored Joshua over Alex. They were members of the Order and had to sacrifice one of their sons; they chose Alex. As the game begins Adam has been abducted by the Order, while Lillian is in a catatonic state.

Sam Bartlett
Mayor  is a member of the Bartlett family. As an upholder of the pact, Sam had to sacrifice his son, Joey.

Dr. Martin Fitch
 is the local doctor and a member of the Fitch family. He is regarded as a local hero due to his brave actions to help a school bus full of elementary school students that got lodged under a bridge when the Toluca River became flooded. Alex was one of the students. He must sacrifice his daughter, Scarlet.

Silent Hill: Shattered Memories

Michelle Valdez
 is a Cuban-American graduate of Midwich High School who works at The Balkan club. She is the only major character who did not have a counterpart in the original Silent Hill. Michelle claims that she used to go to school with Cheryl.

Silent Hill: Downpour

Murphy Pendleton
 is the main protagonist and player character. Raised in an orphanage, Murphy respects nuns. He is stated to be a criminal. He eventually stopped and married Carol. Their son Charlie was particularly close to his father. Charlie was abducted and killed by Patrick Napier. Soon after, Carol divorced Murphy, who was so consumed with grief that he allowed himself to be arrested and sent to Ryall State Prison so he could kill Napier. He makes a deal with corrections officer George Sewell, which involved him killing Sewell's fellow officer, Frank Coleridge. During a prisoner transfer to Wayside Maximum Security Prison, the prison bus crashes, though Murphy survives and stumbles upon Silent Hill.

Anne Marie Cunningham
 is one of the main antagonists and the main protagonist of the comic Anne's Story, which retells the story of Downpour from Anne's perspective. A corrections officer at Wayside Maximum Security Prison, Anne oversees the inmate transfer from Ryall State Prison. She suspects that Murphy was the killer of her father, Frank Coleridge. Anne survives the bus crash and tracks Murphy.

Charlie Pendleton
 is the son of Murphy. Charlie and his father often flew kites together and shared an interest in cars. Charlie was kidnapped by Napier, who molested Charlie and threw him in a lake, where he drowned.

Howard Blackwood
 is a postmaster in Silent Hill. He has been working as a postmaster for over a century as he appears in the comic Past Life, which is set in the 19th century  It is implied that he was drawn to Silent Hill after killing someone in self-defense has to undergo his torment over and over. Unlike many other people who stumble over Silent Hill, Howard seems to know a great deal about the mechanism of the town.

Howard also plays a major role in Book of Memories in which he gives the player character the titular book, as well as serving as the in-game shopkeeper.

John P. "JP" Sater
John P. Sater is a former tour guide of the Devil's Pit, a once-popular tourist attraction in Silent Hill. JP was responsible for the death of eight children during a collapse of an underground tram transporting tourists, while he was intoxicated. Defamed and losing his job, JP blamed himself for the accident and became suicidal.

Frank Coleridge
 is a corrections officer at Ryall State Prison, where Murphy was incarcerated. He is Anne's father. She holds him in high regard and is determined to become a corrections officer. Frank treated his colleagues and inmates with respect. He also sincerely believed that everyone can change, as he worked hard to get parole for Murphy, believing the latter to be a good man. Frank, however, did not trust George, as he knew that the latter was corrupt. Frank confronted Murphy and Sewell over Napier's murder, and George ordered Murphy to kill Frank. In the game, he appears in the form of the Wheelman.

Bobby Ricks
Bobby Ricks is a DJ of local radio station WLMN FM in Silent Hill. He has been trapped in Silent Hill for a long time, lacking the courage to leave. He dedicates his broadcasts at Murphy and others.

Patrick Napier
 is a child molester. He abducted, molested, and subsequently killed Charlie. After a similar abduction/murder of eight-year-old Daniel Stephens, Napier was jailed-without-parole, under protective custody, where Murphy killed him.

The Nun
The nun is apparently a manifestation that appears to help Murphy face his guilt over Napier's death.

George Sewell
 is the main antagonist. He is a corrections officer. Corrupt and manipulative, Sewell made a deal with Murphy to let him kill Napier in return for also killing Frank, who was the only one who knew Sewell's evil nature.

Sanchez
Sanchez is Murphy's fellow inmate. He attracts Anne's attention, which results in the prison bus crash

The Bogeyman
The  is one of the antagonists. Appearing as a towering humanoid wearing heavy raincoat, gas mask, and wielding a hammer, it torments both Murphy and Anne over their guilt. A poem is supposedly capable of warding off the Bogeyman

Critical reception
Critics noted the level of realistic detail given to the characters of Silent Hill 2 and Konami's ability to transition between CG and in-game scenes. Game Revolution liked that James was an everyman character instead of a highly trained professional. GameZone praised James' sympathetic character, and found the voice acting improved, though not flawless, as compared to Silent Hill 2s predecessor. Another reviewer considered the voice acting and script superior to the survival horror video game series Resident Evil, while GameSpot criticized the script for hampering the voice acting. IGN's Emma Boyes praised the relationship between James and Mary, listing it as one of "The Greatest Video Game Couples".

The character of Heather received both praise and criticism. GameSpot's Scott Osborne found her "interesting" and liked the fact that although she seems to be an average girl, she remains non-intimidated upon witnessing sights he considered frightening, stating that "even Rambo would run like hell from that." Chris Hudak of Game Revolution regarded her as "believable" and "more likeable" than the protagonists of the two previous games in the series, because he esteemed her as having "some attitude", "vulnerability", and "snarky teenaged wit".

The character of Claudia received praise for her role as a villain. Complex ranked her eleventh in their "Bad Girls Club: The 25 Most Diabolical Video Game She-Villains", while Cheat Code Central listed her as one of the best video game villains.

References

External links
 Silent Hill 2 
 Silent Hill 3 
 Silent Hill: Shattered Memories 

Silent Hill 2 and 3